Lake Elsman is a  reservoir, created by an earthen dam called Austrian Dam on Los Gatos Creek in the Santa Cruz Mountains of California. At several points it is over 140' deep and its normal surface area is 96 acres. It provides 12% of San Jose Water Works’ total water capacity in some years. The lake and dam is owned by the San Jose Water Company,

In 1988 and 1989, two earthquakes at M=5.3  and 5.4 respectively occurred at Lake Elsman that transferred stress that led to the 1989 M=6.9 1989 Loma Prieta earthquake.

Austrian Dam
Construction of the Austrian Dam was completed in 1950. Beneath the reservoir are the remains of the settlements of Austrian Gulch and Germantown. The dam was damaged in the Loma Prieta quake. The performance of Austrian Dam during that earthquake reinforces concerns about damage to the tops of earth dams by earthquakes.

See also
List of dams and reservoirs in California
List of lakes in California

References

Reservoirs in Santa Clara County, California
Reservoirs in California
Reservoirs in Northern California